Grechko may refer to:

Andrei Grechko (1903–1976), Soviet general, Marshal of the Soviet Union, Minister of Defense
Georgy Grechko (1931–2017), a Soviet cosmonaut